Forest of the Damned II: Death by Desire is a 2008 horror film directed by Ernest Mari.

Plot

Despite Lucy's reservations, she agrees to her husband’s request to attend a wild party of lust and sexual exploration on a remote island. Their passion soon turns to terror when they discover that one of the group has disappeared. Some start to believe there is something evil lurking in the forest while others begin to suspect each other. Lucy's biggest fear was that the weekend could ruin her marriage, she didn't realize it could cost her her life too.

Cast

Production
Forest of the Damned II was shot in HD in Dorset, and London.<rwef>Is ‘Forest of The Damned II: Death by Desire’ a horror film?</ref>

Soundtrack

The score was composed by Robert Pawliczek, Bernhard Riener and Arlen Figgis. The soundtrack features songs by Belligerence.

Release

The full-length film will be released in and will run as Demonic II in the United States.

Reception

Prequel

The movie is the sequel to Forest of the Damned, which was sold in over 30 countries worldwide with Warner Brothers releasing in the U.K. the director Ernest Riera worked as producer on the film.

References

External links

Official site

2008 horror films
British horror films
Films shot in England
2008 films
2000s English-language films
2000s British films